LabX Media Group is an Ontario-based media and technology company focused on the biological research community. Founded in 1995 as an online marketplace for laboratory equipment, it has grown through various acquisitions to now have a presence in publishing and laboratory services.

Brands
LabX Media Group operates under a number of different brands representing different industries. The company was originally founded as LabX, an online marketplace for laboratory products. 

1DegreeBio, an online marketplace for life sciences products, was founded in 2009 as an independent company, but was acquired by LabX Media Group in 2016. 

LabWrench.com, an online forum for discussing laboratory equipment, was started by LabX Media Group in 2010 and is now partially integrated into the LabX marketplace.

The other major arm of LabX Media Group's brands is science publishing. 

Lab Manager Magazine (acquired in 2008) is a trade journal for research lab managers. The Scientist (magazine) (acquired in 2011) is a professional magazine targeted towards life science researchers, with articles on current biology research. 

In 2016, LabX Media Group acquired UK-based Technology Networks, another trade journal targeted towards research scientists.

References

External links

 Company website

Companies based in Ontario
Publishing companies of Canada